Jan Hasištejnský z Lobkovic (1450–1517) was a Bohemian diplomat of the House of Lobkowicz. He undertook diplomatic missions to Luxembourg (in 1477) and Rome (in 1487) in the time of Ladislaus II of Bohemia and Hungary. The king sent him to negotiate a marriage with Mary of Burgundy, which was ultimately unsuccessful. He made a journey to Palestine in 1493 and wrote a travel book about it, titled Pilgrimage to the Holy Grave in Jerusalem (first published in 1505). He also edited Advice and Precept to the Son Jaroslav, What to Do and What to Beware. He founded the Franciscan monastery in Kadaň. He died on or around 28 January 1517 and is buried in the monastery. He was the elder brother of the so-called "Czech Ulysses" Bohuslav Hasištejnský z Lobkovic.

1450 births
1517 deaths
Lobkowicz family